Krumbach (also: Krumbach (Schwaben)) is a town with 13,000 residents in the district Günzburg in Swabia, Bavaria, Germany. It is the second biggest town in the district.

Geography

Krumbach (elevation 512 m (1680 ft)) is situated in Mittelschwaben in the natural region Lower Iller-Lech Gravel Plateau (a part of the region between Danube and the Alps) in the valley of the Kammel, a left tributary of the Mindel river and so an indirect tributary of the Danube river. The landscape is marked by forests and areas in agricultural acreage (fields and grassland).

The next bigger cities respectively towns are Ulm, approximately 40 kilometres northwest of Krumbach, Augsburg, 48 kilometres northeast of Krumbach, Memmingen, about 40 kilometres southwest of Krumbach, Mindelheim, 30 kilometres south of Krumbach and Günzburg, 27 kilometres north of Krumbach. The distance to Munich is approximately 120 kilometres.

History

In 1156 Krumbach was mentioned in documents the first time, in 1370 the village got the right to hold a market. From 1305 until 1805 Krumbach was part of the Margraviate of Burgau, which was part of the Habsburg Further Austria. In the year 1805 Krumbach became Bavarian by the Peace of Pressburg. 90 years later Krumbach became a town. In the year 1902 the previously independent municipality Hürben, a neighbouring village of Krumbach, merged into Krumbach. Until the time of the Third Reich Hürben had a high percentage of Jewish residents in comparison to the Bavarian average.

Until 1972 Krumbach was the district seat of the administrative district Krumbach (Swabia).

Bavarian regional reforms merged the previously independent municipalities of Hohenraunau (1972/01/01), Billenhausen with Hirschfelden (1972/07/01), Edenhausen with the Krumbad (1973/01/01), Attenhausen (1977/01/01) and Niederraunau (1978/05/01) into Krumbach.

The Krumbad is a health resort approximately one kilometre east of Krumbach. It is the oldest health resort of Swabia.

Coat of arms

The colours of the town (red and white) as well as the arms (a silver-coloured wavy thick line in red) remind one on the one hand of the long affiliation to Further Austria on the other hand it is a canting arms – the crooked stream. In this context, it is important to know, that the meander of the Kammel are clearly distinct.

Attractions

 market place and historic town hall
 church St Michael
 church St Ulrich in Hürben
 church Maria Hilf
 church Lindlkirche
 Mühlkapelle
 castle of Krumbach
 moated castle of Hürben
 Landauer Haus
 Middleswabian lokal heritage museum
 waxart museum MORSA
 Krumbad
 church of Niederraunau
 castle of Niederraunau
 Dossenberger Pfarrhof (parsonage) Billenhausen

Economy, transport and public institutions

In Krumbach, there are car suppliers, a paint factory, plant construction factories, weaving mills, wax factories, and a wall-to-wall carpeting factory.

Two Bundesstraßen pass Krumbach: the Bundesstraße 16 (B 16) Günzburg-Mindelheim and the Bundesstraße 300 (B 300) Memmingen-Augsburg. The distances to the Autobahnen 7, 8 and 96 are each approximately 25 kilometres. Furthermore, Krumbach has a railway station at the railway from Günzburg to Mindelheim (Mittelschwaben Railway), a loop line, which connects the main lines Bavarian Maximilian Railway (Munich-Augsburg-Ulm-Stuttgart) and the railway from Munich to Zurich via Buchloe, Memmingen and Lindau (Bodensee).

In Krumbach there are quite a few public institutions: police station, forestry commission office, planning department and several schools: secondary schools, grammar school and vocational schools;

Miscellaneous

In the valley of Günz – approximately six kilometres west of Krumbach there is the Oberrieder Weiher, a flooded gravel pit and popular greenbelt recreation area. At the shores of this lake, there is a camping site, too.

Notable births
 Franz Tausend (1884–1942), German alchemist and fraudster 
 Ernst Heinrich Buschor (1886–1961), archaeologist 
 Gerd Müller (born 1955), politician (CSU)
 Georg Nüßlein (b. 1969), politician (CSU)
 Volkher Häusler (b. 1958), conductor and church musician 
 Gerhard Wisnewski (b. 1959), writer 
 Thomas Tuchel (b. 1973), football coach

See also
 Synagogues of the Swabian type (Krumbach)

References

Populated places in Günzburg (district)